This is a list of peer-reviewed, English language academic journals in public relations.

 Asia Pacific Public Relations Journal, Deakin University, Australia
 Case Studies in Strategic Communication, University of Southern California, United States
 Corporate Communications: An International Journal
 International Journal of Strategic Communication, International
 Journal of Communication Management
 Journal of Public Relations Research, Association for Education in Journalism and Mass Communication, United States
 PRism, Massey University & Bond University, New Zealand
 Public Relations Inquiry, SAGE Publications, United Kingdom
 Public Relations Journal, Public Relations Society of America, United States
 Public Relations Quarterly, Routledge, United Kingdom (defunct)
 Public Relations Review, Elsevier, United Kingdom
 Teaching Public Relations, Association for Education in Journalism and Mass Communication, United States

See also
 List of press release agencies

Public relations
Technical communication